Finland was represented by Seija Simola, with the song "Anna rakkaudelle tilaisuus", at the 1978 Eurovision Song Contest, which took place on 24 April in Paris.

Before Eurovision

National final
The Finnish national final was held on February 11 at the YLE TV Studios in Tampere. The final was hosted by Klaus Thomasson. For the first time since 1966 the conductor in the national final was not Ossi Runne but Risto Hiltunen instead. The winner was chosen by regional juries.

At Eurovision
On the night of the final Simola performed fourth in the running order following Italy and preceding Portugal. The Finnish entry was conducted by Ossi Runne. Finland received two points from Norway and placed joint 18th (with Turkey) of the 20 entries.

Voting

Sources
Viisukuppila- Muistathan: Suomen karsinnat 1978 
Finnish national final 1978 on natfinals

External links
Full national final on Yle Elävä Arkisto  

1978
Countries in the Eurovision Song Contest 1978
Eurovision